Yehoshua Bar-Hillel (8 September 1915, in Vienna – 25 September 1975, in Jerusalem) was an Israeli philosopher, mathematician, and linguist. He was a pioneer in the fields of machine translation and formal linguistics.

Biography
Born Oscar Westreich in Vienna, Austria-Hungary, he was raised in Berlin. In 1933 he emigrated to Palestine with the Bnei Akiva youth movement, and briefly joined the kibbutz Tirat Zvi before settling in Jerusalem and marrying Shulamith.

During World War II, he served in the Jewish Brigade of the British Army. He fought with the Haganah during the 1948 Arab–Israeli War, losing an eye.

Bar-Hillel received his PhD in Philosophy from the Hebrew University where he also studied mathematics under Abraham Fraenkel, with whom he eventually coauthored Foundations of Set Theory (1958, 1973).

Bar-Hillel was a major disciple of Rudolf Carnap, whose Logical Syntax of Language much influenced him. He began a correspondence with Carnap in the 1940s, which led to a 1950 post-doctorate under Carnap at the University of Chicago, and to his collaborating on Carnap's 1952 An Outline of the Theory of Semantic Information.

Bar-Hillel then took up a position at MIT, where he was the first academic to work full-time in the field of machine translation. Bar-Hillel organised the first International Conference on Machine Translation in 1952. Later he expressed doubts that general-purpose fully automatic high-quality machine translation would ever be feasible. He was also a pioneer in the field of information retrieval.

In 1953, Bar-Hillel joined the philosophy department at the Hebrew University, where he taught until his death at age 60. His teachings and writings strongly influenced an entire generation of Israeli philosophers and linguists, including Asa Kasher and Avishai Margalit. In 1953, he founded a pioneering algebraic-computational linguistic group, and in 1961 he contributed to the proof of the pumping lemma for context-free languages (sometimes called the Bar-Hillel lemma). Bar-Hillel helped found the Hebrew University's department of Philosophy of Science. From 1966 to 1969 Bar-Hillel presided over the Division for Logic, Methodology and Philosophy of Science of the
International Union of History and Philosophy of Science.

Bar-Hillel's daughter Maya Bar-Hillel is a cognitive psychologist at the Hebrew University, known for her collaborations with Amos Tversky and for her role in critiquing Bible code study. His other daughter, Mira Bar-Hillel, is a freelance journalist who has worked for the London Evening Standard. His granddaughter, Gili Bar-Hillel, is the Hebrew translator of the Harry Potter series of books.

Related terms
Categorial grammar
Indexical expression

Notes
Melby, Alan. The Possibility of Language (Amsterdam:Benjamins, 1995, 27-41)
Appendix III of 'The present status of automatic translation of languages', Advances in Computers, vol.1 (1960), p.158-163. Reprinted in Y.Bar-Hillel: Language and information (Reading, Mass.: Addison-Wesley, 1964), p.174-179.

Select bibliography

References

External links
 "Yehoshua Bar-Hillel: A Philosopher's Contribution to Machine Translation"
 "Bar-Hillel and Machine Translation: Then and Now. "
 Bar-Hillel Colloquium.
 Translation Trouble: Time Magazine article from 1954.

1915 births
1975 deaths
20th-century Israeli mathematicians
Hebrew University of Jerusalem alumni
Academic staff of the Hebrew University of Jerusalem
20th-century Israeli Jews
Jewish Brigade personnel
Jewish emigrants from Nazi Germany to Mandatory Palestine
Jewish philosophers
Jewish scientists
Linguists from Israel
Machine translation researchers
Mandatory Palestine military personnel of World War II
Mathematical logicians
Members of the Israel Academy of Sciences and Humanities
Philosophers of language
20th-century linguists
20th-century Israeli philosophers
Massachusetts Institute of Technology faculty